Tony Vincent (born 17 August, 1926) is an American former amateur tennis player.

Vincent was born in the Bronx, New York and grew up in Elmhurst, a neighbourhood of Queens. His father Salvatore, a classical musician, played trombone for the famed Metropolitan Opera of New York.

An Air Force bombardier during the war, Vincent was most productive on tour in the 1950s.

Vincent won the Canadian championship title in 1951 on grass at Windsor, Ontario, defeating Canadian clay court specialist Lorne Main in the semifinal and American clay court specialist Seymour Greenberg in the final in four sets. 

Princess Grace presented the trophies at the 1956 Monte Carlo championships for the first time following her marriage to Prince Rainier.

He reached the fourth round at the 1957 U.S. National Championships.

Vincent continued to play senior's tennis and won the 35 years and over national title on multiple occasions. 

Vincent worked as a Wall Street investor. By the 1980s he was living in retirement after 17 years of an active career in Wall Street.

References

External links
 

Year of birth missing (living people)
Possibly living people
American male tennis players
Tennis people from New York (state)
Sportspeople from New York City
People from Elmhurst, Queens
United States Army Air Forces personnel of World War II